Spiricoelotes is a genus of East Asian funnel weavers first described by X. P. Wang in 2002.

Species
 it contains nine species:

Spiricoelotes anshiensis Chen & Li, 2016 – China
Spiricoelotes chufengensis Chen & Li, 2016 – China
Spiricoelotes nansheensis Chen & Li, 2016 – China
Spiricoelotes pseudozonatus Wang, 2003 – China
Spiricoelotes taipingensis Chen & Li, 2016 – China
Spiricoelotes urumensis (Shimojana, 1989) – Japan (Ryukyu Is.)
Spiricoelotes xianheensis Chen & Li, 2016 – China
Spiricoelotes xiongxinensis Chen & Li, 2016 – China
Spiricoelotes zonatus (Peng & Wang, 1997) – China, Japan

References

External links

Agelenidae
Araneomorphae genera
Spiders of China